Nais Lago (born 25 February 1914) was an Italian actress.

Life and career 
Born  Nais La Gattella in Rijeka (at the time the Italian city Fiume), after studying in Trieste she moved to Rome, where she made her film debut appearing in two minor roles in Goffredo Alessandrini Seconda B and Alessandro Blasetti's 1860. Lago later attended the Centro Sperimentale di Cinematografia, graduating in 1936. She then devoted herself to the theater, entering the major stage companies of the time. She was also active in films, even if usually cast in character roles, and on television.

References

External links 
 

Italian film actresses
Italian television actresses
Italian stage actresses
Actors from Rijeka
Centro Sperimentale di Cinematografia alumni
Possibly living people
1914 births